BP Exploration Co (Libya) v Hunt (No 2) [1983] 2 AC 352 is an English contract and unjust enrichment case, concerning the frustration of an agreement.

Facts
In 1957 Nelson Bunker Hunt obtained an oil concession for the Sarir field in Libya. In 1960, he contracted with BP to exploit the oil. The contract said (1) Hunt would transfer BP half the concession (2) BP would transfer Hunt 'farm in' contributions in cash and oil (3) BP would explore for and develop the oil (4) BP provided all funds until the oil was found, and (5) the profits would be shared, but 3/8 of Hunt's share would go to BP until 125% of the farm in contributions and half the costs of BP were covered. A massive oil reserve was found in 1967. However, in 1971, 2 years after the Libyan government was overthrown and replaced by Muammar Gaddafi, it nationalised BP's half share. BP had already covered half its costs. Two years later in 1973, the Libyan government also expropriated Hunt from his share. BP claimed the contract was frustrated, and claimed for a just sum of money to be awarded under the Law Reform (Frustrated Contracts) Act 1943, section 1(3).

Judgment

High Court
Robert Goff J held the contract was frustrated in 1971 and under the Law Reform (Frustrated Contracts) Act 1943, section 1(3) awarded BP $35.4m plus interest. He held there are two steps in a section 1(3) claim. First, identify the value of the benefit, which could be the value of the services performed or the end product of the services. Regard can be had to the value of services when no end product results or where the end product has no objective value, but where the end product is destroyed by fire, there is no claim under section 1(3) because the value has been reduced to zero by the frustrating event. The effect, therefore, was to lead to the same result as in Appleby. The second step is to assess what is a ‘just sum’. Robert Goff J said it was the sum that would lead to ‘the prevention of the unjust enrichment of the defendant at the plaintiff’s expense’

Court of Appeal
The Court of Appeal upheld the decision of Goff J. Lawton LJ said that judges under the Act have complete discretion to award what they think is fair, and found he got 'no help from the use of words which are not in the statute', such as "unjust enrichment".

House of Lords
A more limited appeal on the wording of section 2(3) was dismissed.

See also
English contract law
Frustration in English law

References

House of Lords cases
1983 in case law
1983 in British law
English frustration case law
BP litigation
Petroleum in Libya